Globe Life Liberty National Division, formerly Liberty National Life Insurance, located in McKinney, Texas, is a provider of life and supplemental health insurance. It provides individual coverage through home and workplace sales. Licensed in 49 states, Liberty National was founded in Birmingham, Alabama, in 1900.

History
Liberty National traces its origin back to August 27, 1900. Its predecessor was founded as the Heralds of Liberty, a fraternal organization founded on the principles of respect for the law, observance of cardinal Christian virtues, loyalty to government, and practical exemplification of brotherhood. Later in June 1921, the name was changed to Liberty Life Assurance Company by deputy insurance commissioner Robert Davison and Frank Samford. In 1929, LNL was incorporated as a stock company and its name was changed to Liberty National Life Insurance Company.

The Liberty National Holding Company, created in 1979, expanded by acquiring United American, along with Globe Life and Accident Insurance Company and American Income Life. In the 1980s, the Liberty National Insurance Holding Company became Torchmark Corporation which then became Globe Life on August 8, 2019.

Since 2012, the Globe Life companies have donated more than $12.4 million through their Make Tomorrow Better program.

References

External links
 Official website

Financial services companies established in 1900
Health insurance companies of the United States
Life insurance companies of the United States
Companies based in McKinney, Texas
Globe Life Subsidiaries
1900 establishments in Texas